SleepBot was an alarm clock and sleep tracker available as both a mobile application and web application.  It also included a "smart alarm" feature, sleep debt estimation, and other features. The mobile version worked with Android and iOS smartphones and tablets; the web version worked on any modern computer with a web browser.

Jane Zhu, a member of the development team, wrote that SleepBot development ceased. The last update, SleepBot 1.3 for iOS, was released in April 2016 to improve iOS 9.3 compatibility.

Availability 

SleepBot 3.2.8 for Android is no longer available from the Google Play Store. SleepBot 1.3 for iOS is no longer available from the App Store.

Features 
SleepBot included two main features: "sleep debt estimation" and "smart alarms."

 SleepBot claims to estimate how much sleep debt the user has incurred.
 Modern devices running Android and iOS have built-in microphones and accelerometers. SleepBot's "smart alarm" feature is designed to attempt to wake the user during non-REM sleep. This does not prevent sleep debt or keep the user from experiencing any of the mental and physical side effects of sleep deprivationmicrophones and accelerometers. SleepBot's "smart alarm" feature is designed to attempt to wake the user during non-REM sleep. This does not prevent sleep debt or keep the user from experiencing any of the mental and physical side effects of sleep deprivation, but it may help to prevent early-morning grogginess and sleep inertia., but it may help to prevent early-morning grogginess and sleep inertia.

Reception 

General reception was positive. In May 2015, a fair number of Google Play reviewers complained about significant unresolved software bugs.

In Android 6.0 "Marshmallow" and above 

Some of the Google Play reviewers complained about problems with SleepBot's smart alarms ringing on time, and about problems with SleepBot's snooze function. It appears that these problems are related to the "Doze" feature included in Android 6.0 "Marshmallow" and later Android versions.

The workaround for SleepBot's alarm problems is to exempt SleepBot from "Doze" mode.

SleepBot LLC 

In June 2011, SleepBot LLC was formed by Edison Wang and Jane Zhu. Later Daniel Amitay joined the team to work on the iOS app. SleepBot LLC was a limited liability company registered in Delaware.

Competitors 
 ElectricSleep: free and open-source software (Android)
 Sleep Cycle Alarm Clock: proprietary commercial software (Android, iOS)
 Sleep as Android: trialware (Android)

One of the features missing from SleepBot is a "goals" feature. Competitors, including Sleep as Android and some activity trackers, include a "goals" feature which allows users to set sleep goals.

See also 

 Quantified Self#Activity monitors
 Quantified Self#Sleep-specific monitors

References

Further reading

External links 

 

Android (operating system) software
IOS software
2010 establishments in the United States
Health software
Sleep